Capila zennara, commonly known as the pale striped dawnfly, is a species of hesperid butterfly found in tropical Asia.

Range
The butterfly occurs in Sikkim, Bhutan, Northeast India, and has also been recorded in northern Thailand.

The type locality is Bengal.

Description

In 1891, Edward Yerbury Watson gave a detailed description:

Watson also adds:

Cited references

See also
Pyrginae
Hesperiidae
List of butterflies of India (Pyrginae)
List of butterflies of India (Hesperiidae)

References
Print

Watson, E. Y. (1891) Hesperiidae indicae: being a reprint of descriptions of the Hesperiidae of India, Burma, and Ceylon.. Vest and Co. Madras.

Online

Brower, Andrew V. Z. (2007). Capila Moore 1866. Version 4 March 2007 (under construction). http://tolweb.org/Capila/95329/2007.03.04 in The Tree of Life Web Project, http://tolweb.org/

Capila
Butterflies of Asia
Butterflies of Indochina